Kristýna Plíšková won the title, defeating defending champion Nao Hibino in the final, 6–3, 2–6, 6–3.

Seeds

Draw

Finals

Top half

Bottom half

Qualifying

Seeds

Qualifiers

Lucky loser
  Sofia Shapatava

Draw

First qualifier

Second qualifier

Third qualifier

Fourth qualifier

References
Main Draw
Qualifying Draw

2016 WTA Tour
Singles